IFChina Original Studio Participatory Documentary Center is a non-profit art and cultural organization that utilizes film, photography, oral history, and theater productions to promote local culture, and to document history and realities from the perspectives of ordinary citizens. IFChina was founded in 2008 by Chinese independent filmmaker, artist, and writer Jian Yi, along with Douglas Xiao and Eva Song.  Jian Yi co-founded the China Village Documentary Project with filmmaker Wu Wenguang in 2004, which was the impetus for the development of IFChina.

IFChina is located in Ji'an of Jiangxi province, China. The inland province is at the crossroads of the Yangtze River Delta and the Pearl River Delta with large numbers of migrant workers in the three coastal provinces it borders. The small city of Jian is within the Jinggangshan region, the cradle of the Chinese Civil War and birthplace of the Chinese Red Army (the People's Liberation Army of China). This location is representative of an urban community within a vast rural area, providing a template for other cultural organizations to follow. RealTime magazine reported that IFChina is China’s first non-profit art and cultural organization that collects and documents the stories of the ordinary Chinese.

In June 2009, the organization sought to be under the umbrella of the state-owned Jinggangshan University (JGSU) and established its Participatory Documentary Center on JGSU campus. dGenerate Films reports that “The IFChina team reaches out to people from every walk of life from unemployed workers, school children, college students, migrant workers, to rural women, children, and elderly. Currently, much of its work focuses on self-governance of China’s rural communities and the social and demographic changes occurring due to urban migration, specifically for children and elderly who have been described as left behind. Emphasis is placed on offering perspectives of the villagers themselves and their daily lives through independent documentary film and theater with the aim to preserve individual and communal memories.

Undertakings include oral history interviewing, participatory documentary workshops, school photography workshops, a documentary theater project, exploration of Red History and Culture (state efforts to generate public support for its political ideology and legitimacy), a rice collection project called 'A Scoop of Rice' which utilizes volunteers to deliver rice or noodles to senior citizens as a compensation for recording their stories, a Happy Rooms mural project, university courses offered in partnership with Jinggangshan University, a Rural Design Workshop, and a planned "Museum of Memories" (MoM) to collect and preserve the organization’s projects. IFChina aims to foster a more civil society and functional world.
Funding derives from ARTiSIMPLE Studio in Beijing, the Prince Claus Fund for Culture and Development, the Narada Foundation, as well as through online private donations for both funding and media equipment.

See also 
 Cinema of China
 Oral history in China
 Civic engagement in China

References

External links 
 IFChina Museum of Memories

Cultural organizations based in China
Historic preservation in China
Film organizations in China